Mali sent a delegation to compete at the 2008 Summer Paralympics in Beijing, People's Republic of China. According to official records, the only athlete would have been powerlifter Facourou Sissoko. However, Sissoko was not allowed to start in the -75 kg class due to having tested positive for steroid use on September 6. He was given a two-year ban

See also
Mali at the Paralympics
Mali at the 2008 Summer Olympics

References

External links
International Paralympic Committee

Nations at the 2008 Summer Paralympics
2008
Summer Paralympics